The Hedgehog and the Fox is an essay by philosopher Isaiah Berlin that was published as a book in 1953. It was one of his most popular essays with the general public. However, Berlin said, "I meant it as a kind of enjoyable intellectual game, but it was taken seriously. Every classification throws light on something". It has been compared to "an intellectual's cocktail-party game".

Summary
The title is a reference to a fragment attributed to the Ancient Greek poet Archilochus:  ("a fox knows many things, but a hedgehog knows one big thing"). In Erasmus's Adagia from 1500, the expression is recorded as Multa novit vulpes, verum echinus unum magnum. (The fable of The Fox and the Cat embodies the same idea.)

Berlin expands upon this idea to divide writers and thinkers into two categories: hedgehogs, who view the world through the lens of a single defining idea (examples given include Plato, Lucretius, Dante Alighieri, Blaise Pascal, Georg Wilhelm Friedrich Hegel, Fyodor Dostoyevsky, Friedrich Nietzsche, Henrik Ibsen, Marcel Proust and Fernand Braudel), and foxes, who draw on a wide variety of experiences and for whom the world cannot be boiled down to a single idea (examples given include Herodotus, Aristotle, Desiderius Erasmus, William Shakespeare, Michel de Montaigne, Molière, Johann Wolfgang Goethe, Aleksandr Pushkin, Honoré de Balzac, James Joyce and Philip Warren Anderson).

Turning to Leo Tolstoy, Berlin contends that at first glance, Tolstoy escapes definition into one of the two groups. He postulates that while Tolstoy's talents are those of a fox, his beliefs are that one ought to be a hedgehog and so Tolstoy's own voluminous assessments of his own work are misleading. Berlin goes on to use this idea of Tolstoy as a basis for an analysis of the theory of history that Tolstoy presents in his novel War and Peace.

In the latter half of the essay, Berlin compares Tolstoy with the early 19th-century thinker Joseph de Maistre. As Berlin explains, while Tolstoy and de Maistre held violently contrasting views on more superficial matters, they also held profoundly similar views about the fundamental nature of existence and the limits of a rational scientific approach to it.

The essay ends with Berlin reiterating his view of Tolstoy—by nature a fox but a hedgehog by conviction—concluding that this duality caused Tolstoy great pain at the end of his life.

Influence

In business and forecasting 
James C. Collins refers to the story in his 2001 book Good to Great: Why Some Companies Make the Leap... and Others Don't , where he clearly shows his preference towards hedgehog mentality.

Philip E. Tetlock, a political psychology professor at the University of Pennsylvania, drew heavily on this distinction in his exploration of the accuracy of experts and forecasters in various fields (especially politics) in his 2005 book Expert Political Judgment: How Good Is It? How Can We Know?.

In his 2012 The New York Times bestselling book The Signal and the Noise, forecaster Nate Silver urges readers to be "more foxy" after summarising Berlin's distinction. He cites the work of Philip E. Tetlock on the accuracy of political forecasts in the United States during the Cold War while he was a professor of political science at the University of California, Berkeley. Silver's news website, fivethirtyeight.com, when it was launched in March 2014, also adopted the fox as its logo "as an allusion to" Archilochus' original work.

In 2018, the author John Lewis Gaddis refers to Berlin's essay as well as Tetlock's work in his 2018 book On Grand Strategy.

In other disciplines 
Some authors such as Michael Walzer have used the same pattern of description for Berlin himself, as a person who knows many things, compared to the purported narrowness of many other contemporary political philosophers. Berlin's former student, Canadian philosopher Charles Taylor, was dubbed a hedgehog by Berlin and admitted to it after receiving the 2007 Templeton Prize.

Legal philosopher Ronald Dworkin's 2011 book, Justice for Hedgehogs, argues the case for a single, overarching, and coherent framework of moral truth.

Music historian Berthold Hoeckner applies and extends Berlin's distinction in his 2007 essay "Wagner and the Origin of Evil". One of Hoeckner's key insights is that the historiography of Wagner's antisemitism, much like that of the Holocaust, has two main branches: a hedgehog-like functionalist branch that sees the composer's polemic jabs at Jewish culture as mere assimilationist rhetoric, and a fox-like intentionalist branch that sees them instead as violent expressions of genuinely eliminationist Judenhass.

In his book Wittgenstein's Place in Twentieth-Century Analytic Philosophy, Oxford philosopher Peter Hacker uses this metaphor to contrast Berlin's Tolstoy (a fox who wants to be a hedgehog) with philosopher Ludwig Wittgenstein, who was "by nature a hedgehog, but after 1929 transformed himself, by great intellectual and imaginative endeavour, into a paradigmatic fox".

Claudio Véliz uses Berlin's construction to contrast Anglo-American and Spanish patterns of settlement and governance in his 1994 book The New World of the Gothic Fox Culture and Economy in English and Spanish America.

Peter Kivy refers to the essay when describing philosophy of art in the current day as the age of the fox (best represented by Noël Carroll), contrasting it with the previous era of the hedgehog (best represented by Arthur Danto).

Harvard political economist Dani Rodrik applies the distinction to "hedgehog" mainstream orthodox economists who apply the "Liberal Paradigm" to everything everywhere always and "fox" heterodox (political) economists who have different answers to different times, places, and situations in his 2015 book Economics Rules: The Rights and Wrongs of the Dismal Science.

Leading Judge, Lord Hoffmann, observed that "Copyright law protects foxes better than hedgehogs" in his Judgment in the case Designers Guild Ltd v Russell Williams (Textiles) Ltd in the UK House of Lords.

In popular culture 
 In Woody Allen's 1992 film Husbands and Wives, Judy Davis's character Sally muses while having sex about whether people she knows are hedgehogs or foxes
 Rock band Luna's 1995 album Penthouse contains a song called "Hedgehog", which asks "Are you a fox or a hedgehog"
 There is a Richard Serra sculpture called "The Hedgehog and the Fox", which was installed at Princeton University in 2000.

Hedgehogs and foxes

Hedgehogs

Foxes

Publication 
In addition to the essay's 1953 publication as a book, it has been published as part of a 2008 collection of Berlin's writings, Russian Thinkers, edited by Henry Hardy and Aileen Kelly. The essay also appears in a 2000 anthology of Berlin's writings, The Proper Study of Mankind: An Anthology of Essays.

See also
 Conceptual framework
 Foxes in popular culture, films and literature
 Hedgehogs in culture
 Homo unius libri, similar sentiment
 Lumpers and splitters

References

External links
 

1953 essays
1953 non-fiction books
Fictional hedgehogs
Books about foxes
Works about Leo Tolstoy
Books by Isaiah Berlin
Weidenfeld & Nicolson books
Classification of people